Brachymyrmex musculus is a species of ant in the family Formicidae.

References

Further reading

 
 
 
 
 

Formicinae
Insects described in 1899